This is a list of Flash supporting characters.

In chronological order with name, first appearance and description.

Family tree

Golden Age

Silver Age

Bronze Age

Modern Age

From alternate realities

In other media

See also 
 Flash (comic book)
 List of Flash enemies
 Rogues

External links
 Flash: Those Who Ride the Lightning

References 

Supporting Characters
Flash supporting
Flash